Democratic Renewal Party can refer to:

 2016 Plebiscite on Democratic Renewal

Alliance for Democratic Renewal
Democratic Renewal
Democratic Renewal (Andorra)
Democratic Renewal Party (Albania)
Democratic Renewal Party (Angola)
Democratic Renewal Party (Benin)
Democratic Renewal Party (Cape Verde)
Democratic Renewal Party (Djibouti)
Democratic Renewal Party (Indonesia)
Democratic Renewal (Lebanon)
Democratic Renewal of Macedonia
Democratic Renewal Party (Portugal)
Democratic Renewal Secretariat
Movement for Democratic Renewal and Development
Union for Democratic Renewal (Republic of the Congo)
Union for Democratic Renewal (Senegal)
Union for the Triumph of Democratic Renewal
Party of Democratic Renewal (Slovenia)
Serbian Democratic Renewal Movement